Ralph Dorn Hetzel (December 31, 1882 – October 3, 1947) was the tenth President of the Pennsylvania State University, serving from 1927 until 1947. Prior to that he served as the President of the New Hampshire College, which became the University of New Hampshire in 1923, under Hetzel's tenure.

It was during Hetzel's presidency that Penn State's football program shifted to the oversight of the University, rather than the Board of Athletic Control, run by alumni at the time. Hugo Bezdek, coach of the football team at the time, was unpopular among influential alumni in the Pittsburgh area. Dissatisfied that Bezdek had been unable to defeat long-time rival University of Pittsburgh, the alumni accepted an agreement that would remove him from the head coaching position in exchange for a transfer of control to the Department of Physical Education, which would be elevated to the status of a school (the present-day College of Health and Human Development).

The Hetzel Union Building (HUB) at Penn State University and Hetzel St. in State College are named for Hetzel.

Hetzel Hall, a dormitory at the University of New Hampshire, is named after him as well.

References

External links
Penn State Presidents and their achievements
"Guide to the Ralph D. Hetzel Papers, 1917-1927", University of New Hampshire Library
University of New Hampshire: Office of the President
Full list of University Presidents (including interim Presidents) , University of New Hampshire Library

1882 births
1947 deaths
People from Merrill, Wisconsin
University of Wisconsin–Madison alumni
Presidents of the University of New Hampshire
Presidents of Pennsylvania State University
20th-century American academics